Dolgoma steineri is a moth in the family Erebidae. It was described by Jeremy Daniel Holloway in 2001. It is found on Borneo. The habitat consists of montane and lowland areas.

References

Moths described in 2001

Dolgoma